Desperate Scousewives is a British scripted-reality television series based in Liverpool. It premiered on E4 at 10:00pm on 28 November 2011. It ran for eight episodes before being cancelled due to stagnating ratings and a perceived lack of interest in cast members from viewers. The show gained favourable viewing figures for its first episode, debuting with 500,000 viewers, 24% up on the E4 channel's slot average. However, episodes for the rest of the series were regularly below this figure and outside of the E4 top-10 weekly rankings.

The show's name is a play on words of the American comedy-drama Desperate Housewives and was said to be "Liverpool's answer to The Only Way Is Essex and Made in Chelsea". Repeats began airing on 4Music from 26 April 2012, sparking speculation from cast members that it may be a test run to recommission a new series on 4Music instead of E4. However, E4 reaffirmed their decision several times about the show's cancellation via their official Twitter page despite cast members continually claiming that a second series is in production.

Overview

When Desperate Scousewives debuted, E4 described it as: "Meet the strong, independent women who quite literally run this town, looking to make a name for themselves in the city famous for its big personalities, big dreams, and even bigger hair. In a world revolving around football, fierce fashion, and that famous WAG style, Scouse girls and boys are all about having a boss night out on the town. But looking good is a 24/7 job as the ladies dress to impress to bag themselves the man of their dreams. The next generation of Liverpudlians determined to show the UK just what they're all about. Behind the blonde hair, 'Scouse eyebrows', football matches and club nights are real guys and girls determined to make a name for themselves, work hard and achieve a dream no matter how big or small. The girls spend every hard earned penny making sure they stand out from the crowd. And the boys of Liverpool have to work hard to keep up with them, woo them, and win their hearts. But they're not adverse [sic] to a bit of Premiership style preening themselves; some of Liverpool's most handsome and sought-after guys are pros at living a footballer's lifestyle, even if it is just off the pitch."

Reception

Critical reception
The reaction to Desperate Scousewives was largely negative and prompted strong criticism from both the mainstream media and audiences alike. On social networking site Twitter, local Liverpudlians claimed that the show's cast were not representative of Liverpool and that they exploited it purely for entertainment purposes, as, despite its title, many cast members are not married and some did not even originate from Liverpool. The content of the show was also criticised heavily as being scripted and devoid of plot or substance and produced simply to establish a show based upon Merseyside following the format of other successful regional 'structured reality' shows such as The Only Way Is Essex, Made in Chelsea and Geordie Shore.

Panned by critics, Keith Watson of Metro described Desperate Scousewives as "depressing viewing" adding that the show "simply takes the TOWIE template up the Mersey Tunnel, at the bleached bottom end of which you’ll find the most depressing bunch of faked-up, vacuous wannabes we've suffered since, well... the last of these unreal reality shows was launched. Five minutes in the company of Amanda, Joe, Layla and poison blogger Jaiden, and my faith in human nature was hitting zero. Not one of them can hold a conversation that’s not about themselves. They all live in a toxic, self-absorbed bubble. And they’re not even funny."

Ratings
Episode viewing figures from BARB.

Desperate Scousewives gained favourable viewing figures for its first episode debuting with 500,000 viewers, 24% up on the E4 channel's slot average. However, episodes for the rest of the series were regularly below this figure and outside of the E4 Top 10 weekly rankings.

Cancellation
On 2 February 2012, E4 executive producers announced that they would not recommission Desperate Scousewives for a second series.

Cast members

References

External links

Desperate Scousewives Sean Clancy Photoshoot at Rorylewis.co.uk

2011 British television series debuts
2012 British television series endings
2010s British reality television series
E4 reality television shows
English-language television shows
2010s British satirical television series
Television shows set in Liverpool